Amdanga Jugal Kishore Mahavidyalaya, established in 2007, is a general degree college in Amdanga, North 24 Parganas in the Indian state of West Bengal. It offers undergraduate courses in arts.  It is affiliated to West Bengal State University.

Departments

Arts

Bengali
English
History
Political Science
Philosophy
Education

See also
Education in India
List of colleges in West Bengal
Education in West Bengal

References

External links
 

Educational institutions established in 2007
Colleges affiliated to West Bengal State University
Universities and colleges in North 24 Parganas district
2007 establishments in West Bengal